Fondaryo is a jamoat in north-west Tajikistan. It is located in Ayni District in Sughd Region. The jamoat has a total population of 9,478 (2015). It takes its name from the river Fan Darya. It consists of 12 villages, including Dizhik, Kante, Khayronbed and Piniyon.

References

Populated places in Sughd Region
Jamoats of Tajikistan